Castagna may refer to:

People
Andrea del Castagno (c.1419–1457), Italian painter
Cristina Castagna (1977–2009), Italian mountaineer
Filippo Castagna (1765–1830), Maltese politician
William J. Castagna (1924–2020), American jurist

Companies
Carrozzeria Castagna, an Italian coachbuilding company from Milan

Places
 Castagna, Catanzaro, a town in the Calabria region of southern Italy
 Castel Castagna, a town in the Abruzzo region of central Italy
 Castagna (restaurant), a restaurant in Portland, Oregon, United States

Italian-language surnames